The L'Abbé River (in French: rivière L'Abbé) is a watercourse whose mouth flows into the Bulstrode River in the town of Victoriaville, in the Arthabaska Regional County Municipality (MRC), in the administrative region of Centre-du-Québec, in Quebec, in Canada.

The L'Abbé river flows mainly in agricultural areas.

Geography 

The neighboring geographical slopes of the L'Abbé river are on the north or west side the Bulstrode River, on the east side the Gosselin River and on the south side the Nicolet River.

The Abbé River originates from various agricultural streams, in an agricultural area northwest of Norbertville and south of the Bulstrode River.

Then, it flows on  towards the southwest, up to two bodies of water developed by the city. Finally, it flows on  towards the southwest, crossing route 122, to its mouth.

The l'Abbé river flows on the east bank of the Bulstrode river, upstream of the Beaudet Reservoir, located in the northern part of the town of Victoriaville.

Toponymy 
The toponym "rivière l'Abbé" was made official on August 7, 1978, at the Bank of place names of the Commission de toponymie du Québec.

See also 
 Arthabaska Regional County Municipality
 Princeville
 Victoriaville
 Nicolet River
 Bulstrode River
 List of rivers of Quebec

References 

Arthabaska Regional County Municipality
Rivers of Centre-du-Québec